Rana zhengi is a species of frog in the family Ranidae that is endemic to Sichuan, China.

Its natural habitats are temperate forests, rivers, intermittent rivers, freshwater marshes, and intermittent freshwater marshes.
It is threatened by habitat loss.

References

Sources

Amphibians of China
zhengi
Endemic fauna of Sichuan
Taxonomy articles created by Polbot
Amphibians described in 1999
Taxa named by Zhao Ermi